Fishermen's Competency Certificates Convention, 1966 is  an International Labour Organization Convention.

It was established in 1966, with the preamble stating:
Having decided upon the adoption of certain proposals with regard to fishermen's certificates of competency,...

Ratifications
As of 2022, the convention had been ratified by 10 states.

External links 
Text
Ratifications.

International Labour Organization conventions
Treaties concluded in 1966
Treaties entered into force in 1969
Fishers
Treaties of Belgium
Treaties of the military dictatorship in Brazil
Treaties of Djibouti
Treaties of France
Treaties of West Germany
Treaties of Panama
Treaties of Senegal
Treaties of Sierra Leone
Treaties of Syria
Treaties of Trinidad and Tobago
Admiralty law treaties
1966 in labor relations